Khirbat al-Sarkas was a village in Palestine, located 42 kilometres south of Haifa. It was depopulated during the 1948 Arab-Israeli war.

History
The village was founded by Circassians from Russia who were expelled from their country by the armies of the Czar in the 19th century, approximately 1860. 

A population list from about 1887 showed that  Jerakes had 130 Muslim inhabitants,  who were noted as "Circassians”.

The village was abandoned by the Circassians because of a Malaria epidemic. It was then settled by local Muslim Arabs.

Gan Shmuel was established  in 1913, about 1 km from the village.

British Mandate era
In the 1922 census of Palestine, conducted by the British Mandate authorities, Kherbet al-Sharkas had a population of 74; all Muslims,  increasing sharply in the 1931 census to 383, still all Muslim, in a total of  80 houses.

1948, aftermath
Though the Arab Higher Command had ordered the evacuation of the village's women and children three times prior to April 1948, the villagers did not leave. Described by Benny Morris as "a friendly village", it was nonetheless one of the villages  depopulated at the order of the Israeli Haganah, per their policy to clear the coastal plain of Arab villages in the lead up to the 1948 Arab-Israeli war. The women and children left between 20 April and 22 April 1948, and the men a few days later.

Talmei Elazar was established near the village site in 1952.

In 1992 the place was described: "Cactuses and spikes of grain are scattered across the site; there are no traces of any landmarks or houses. The land near the site is used by Israeli farmers for raising cattle and growing citrus."

References

Bibliography

External links
Welcome To al-Sarkas, Khirbat
Khirbat al-Sarkas, Zochrot
Survey of Western Palestine, Map 8:  IAA, Wikimedia commons
al-Sarkas, Khirbat  at Khalil Sakakini Cultural Center

District of Haifa
Arab villages depopulated prior to the 1948 Arab–Israeli War
Arab villages depopulated during the 1948 Arab–Israeli War